The Men's 4x400m relay T42-46 for amputee athletes at the 2004 Summer Paralympics were held in the Athens Olympic Stadium on 27 September.

Final round

27 Sept. 2004, 11:05

Team Lists

References

M